Neobenedenia is a genus of monopisthocotylean monogenean flatworm parasites.

The most common species, Neobenedenia melleni, causes problematic disease in public aquariums. It was named after ichthyologist Ida May Mellen (1877–1970), who worked at the New York Aquarium from 1916 to 1929.

References

Monopisthocotylea
Monogenea genera